Satish Kumar was an athlete who won the Arjuna Award in 1977-1978.

References

Indian sportspeople
Possibly living people
Year of birth missing
Recipients of the Arjuna Award